Khair bin Muhammad Jefri Jones (born 29 September 1989) is a New Zealand-Malaysian professional footballer who plays as a left-back for Malaysia Super League club Kuala Lumpur Cityk and the Malaysia national team. Born in Malaysia, he was raised in New Zealand and still considers New Zealand as his home.

Club career

Melaka United
In February 2016, Jones joined the professional Malaysian Premier League club, Melaka United. In his first three matches playing for Melaka United, he was employed in his familiar position on the left. Thereafter, he was played as a centre-back due to his 1.91 meter height which gives him an advantage at winning aerial challenges.

International career
In May 2016, Jones was called up to the Malaysian national team for the matches against Myanmar and Timor-Leste. On 28 May 2016, he earned his first international cap for Malaysia in the friendly match against Myanmar, coming on as a substitute for Fazly Mazlan in the 72nd minute at left back. In just his second appearance for Malaysia, Jones scored his first international goal in the Asian Cup Qualification Play-off match against Timor-Leste on 6 June 2016. In that match, he featured in the starting eleven and played as a left winger.

Career statistics

Club

International

International goals
As of match played 6 June 2016. Malaysia score listed first, score column indicates score after each Khair Jones goal.

Personal life
Jones was born to Geoff Jones, a New Zealand father of Welsh descent and Norzam Mahmood, a Malaysian mother, in Seremban, Negeri Sembilan, Malaysia. He left Malaysia when he was a child with his parents and settled in Palmerston North, New Zealand which he considers as his hometown.

Honours
Club

Melaka United

Malaysia Premier League: 2016

References

1989 births
Living people
Malaysian footballers
Malaysian expatriate footballers
Malaysia international footballers
People from Negeri Sembilan
People from Palmerston North
Melaka United F.C. players
Sarawak United FC players
Negeri Sembilan FC players
Kuala Lumpur City F.C. players
Malaysia Premier League players
Association football wingers
Association football fullbacks
Association football central defenders
J